Montville High School is located in Oakdale, Connecticut and serves all communities belonging to the Montville School District. The student population comprises grades 9–12 and is typically about 800 students. The school is located near Leonard J. Tyl Middle School.

References

External links
 

Educational institutions in the United States with year of establishment missing
Montville, Connecticut
Public high schools in Connecticut
Schools in New London County, Connecticut